Larry Meyer is currently an Independent Director for a few retailers. He has been a consultant or in interim positions to companies including Forever 21 and FashionNova. His most recent position of CEO of UNIQLO USA,  a division of Japanese conglomerate Fast Retailing ended in December 2016.
Meyer  joined UNIQLO as  COO for the US in January  2013; he was previously Executive Vice President and Chief Financial Officer at Forever 21. His work history includes Toys R Us and PepsiCo.

References

Businesspeople from New York (state)
American chief financial officers
American chief operating officers
American retail chief executives
American chief executives of manufacturing companies
Living people
Year of birth missing (living people)